In enzymology, a putrescine carbamoyltransferase is an enzyme that catalyzes the chemical reaction

carbamoyl phosphate + putrescine  phosphate + N-carbamoylputrescine

Thus, the two substrates of this enzyme are carbamoyl phosphate and putrescine, whereas its two products are phosphate and N-carbamoylputrescine.

This enzyme belongs to the family of transferases that transfer one-carbon groups, specifically the carboxy- and carbamoyltransferases. The systematic name of this enzyme class is carbamoyl-phosphate:putrescine carbamoyltransferase. Other names in common use include PTCase, putrescine synthase, and putrescine transcarbamylase.

References

 
 

EC 2.1.3
Enzymes of unknown structure